Hesperia meskei, or Meske's skipper, is a species of grass skipper in the butterfly family Hesperiidae. It is found in North America.

The MONA or Hodges number for Hesperia meskei is 4030.

Subspecies
These three subspecies belong to the species Hesperia meskei:
 Hesperia meskei meskei (W. H. Edwards, 1877)
 Hesperia meskei pinocayo Gatrelle & Minno in Gatrelle, Minno & Grkovich, 2003
 Hesperia meskei straton (W. H. Edwards, 1881)

References

Further reading

 

Hesperiinae
Articles created by Qbugbot
Butterflies described in 1877